The 2012–13 Alabama–Huntsville Chargers ice hockey team represents the University of Alabama in Huntsville in the 2012–13 NCAA Division I men's ice hockey season. The Chargers are coached by Kurt Kleinendorst who is in his first season as head coach. His assistant coaches are Gavin Morgan and Tim Flynn. The Chargers play their home games in the Propst Arena at the Von Braun Center and compete as an independent.

On September 25, 2012, only 11 days before the season began, former New Jersey Devils assistant coach and U.S. Under-18 head coach Kurt Kleinendorst was announced as head coach, replacing Chris Luongo.

On January 17, 2013, after months of discussions with conference officials and league member representatives, UAH formally applied to and was accepted to join the Western Collegiate Hockey Association beginning with the 2013-14 season.

Recruiting
UAH added 8 freshmen for the 2012–13 season, including 1 goalie, 3 forwards and 4 defensemen:

Roster

Departures from 2011–12 team
 Tom Durnie, D, graduated
 Andrew Creppin, F
 Jamie Easton, F, graduated
 Nickolas Gatt, D, transferred to Michigan State
 Mac Roy, F, transferred to Robert Morris
 Clarke Saunders, G, transferred to North Dakota

2012–13 team
As of August 30, 2012.

|}

Regular season

Schedule
  Green background indicates win.
  Red background indicates loss.
  Yellow background indicates tie.

Standings

Opponents by conference

Player stats

Skaters

Goaltenders

References

External links
 UAH Chargers Hockey website

Alabama–Huntsville Chargers men's ice hockey seasons
Alabama-Huntsville